= Manshichi Sakamoto =

Japanese photographer

Manshichi Sakamoto (坂本 万七, Sakamoto Manshichi; 1900–1974) was a renowned Japanese photographer. He was known for taking ethnographic photographs.
